Decisions was the fifth studio album by American gospel group The Winans, released in 1987 under Qwest Records. The album was written and produced by Marvin Winans, along with music producer Quincy Jones and Barry Hankerson. The album is a blend of contemporary gospel and R&B, also includes the Grammy winning single "Ain't No Need to Worry" featuring singer Anita Baker and "Love Has No Color" featuring singer-songwriter Michael McDonald. The album peaked at #1 on Billboard's Top Gospel Albums chart.

Track listing

Re-issue

Personnel 

The Winans
 Carvin Winans – vocals 
 Marvin Winans – vocals, percussion 
 Michael Winans – vocals 
 Ronald Winans – vocals

Musicians
 Laythan Armour – keyboards, synthesizer programming, drum programming 
 John Bokowski – keyboards
 Loris Holland – keyboards 
 Wayne Linsey – keyboards 
 Greg Phillinganes – synthesizer programming
 Michael Rochelle – keyboards, synthesizers 
 Harlan Rogers – keyboards 
 Thomas Whitfield – keyboards 
 Hadley Hockensmith – guitars 
 Dean Parks – guitars 
 Lanar Brantley – bass 
 Dean Gant – bass
 Andrew Gouche – bass 
 Abraham Laboriel – bass 
 Bill Maxwell – drums 
 Ollie E. Brown – LinnDrum, percussion 
 Alex Acuña – percussion 
 Barry Hankerson – percussion 
 Justo Almario – horns 
 Anita Baker – lead vocals (1)
 Douglas Williams – additional vocals (1)
 Melvin Williams – additional vocals (1)
 Michael McDonald – lead vocals (7)

Additional backing vocals
 Victor Adams, Fred Hammond, Kevin Anthony Jackson, Celeste McKinney, Kevin Session, Dwayne Whitfield, Angie Winans, BeBe Winans, Debbie Winans, Debra Winans, Regina Winans and Earl J. Wright

Children's choir on "Breaking of Day"
 Carvin Winans Jr., Deborah Joy Winans, Juan Winans, Mario Winans, Marvin Winans Jr., Mike Winans and Shay Winans

Awards
 1988 Soul Train Music Awards - Best Gospel Album Group or Choir

Charts

References

External links
 The Winans

1987 albums
The Winans albums
Warner Records albums